Frank Hernández Spano is an actor, screenwriter and director with a cinema career spanning 25 years in more than 25 films.

As a scriptwriter and director, Spano made the short film Íntimos (2015), and several feature films.  

Spano's film Hora menos (2011) was shown in the official section of the Malaga Festivals 2011, the Moscow Festival, the IFF Panama, the Mostra de Sao Paolo, and the Chicago Latino Film Festival. It won the award for best feature film at the International Festival of Las Palmas de Gran Canarias and Madrid Imagen.

HIDDEN (2017) was Spano's documentary feature film about extreme sport. He was writer/producer/director in a family thriller about organ trafficking: Humanpersons (2018)

Spano has performed as a monologue comedian on Paramount Comedy Spain.

Filmography

As actor

Films

TV Series

As director

Awards

References

Spanish male actors
Spanish screenwriters